Justin George Muzinich (pronounced: moo-ZEH-nich, born November 5, 1977) is an American businessman and former Donald Trump administration official who served as the United States Deputy Secretary of the Treasury, from December 2018 to January 2021. Muzinich previously served as the Counselor to the Secretary at the United States Department of the Treasury. Prior to that, he served as Policy Director for the Presidential Campaign of Jeb Bush.

Early life and education
Muzinich was born to Camille Muzinich, a docent for the Metropolitan Museum of Art in New York City, and George Milan Muzinich, president of Muzinich & Company, a New York finance firm. 

After attending Groton School, Muzinich entered Harvard College where he graduated with a Bachelor of Arts degree magna cum laude and as a member of Phi Beta Kappa in 2000. He earned a Master of Business Administration degree from Harvard Business School in 2005 as a Baker Scholar, and a Juris Doctor degree from Yale Law School in 2007, where he was a John M. Olin Fellow.

Business career 
Prior to joining the Treasury department, Muzinich was previously employed at EMS Capital and at Morgan Stanley in the mergers and acquisitions group. He also served as president of Muzinich & Company, an international investment firm founded by his father. He has also taught at Columbia Business School from 2014 to 2016.

Public sector

Jeb Bush campaign
Muzinich served as Policy Director for former Florida Governor Jeb Bush’s 2016 Presidential campaign. In this role, Muzinich oversaw a team that produced policy proposals for the campaign. Governor Bush later announced his public support of Muzinich’s 2018 nomination to Treasury.

United States Treasury
Muzinich served as United States Deputy Secretary of the Treasury. In that role, Muzinich helped oversee the Department’s $2.2 trillion dollar rescue plan for the COVID-19 outbreak and the Administration’s 2017 Tax Cuts and Jobs Act.

The New York Times reported that he kept a low public profile.

Nomination
On March 13, 2018, President Donald Trump announced his intention to nominate Muzinich as the new United States Deputy Secretary of the Treasury, succeeding Sigal Mandelker. The United States Senate confirmed his nomination with a 55–44 vote.

Tax Cuts and Jobs Act of 2017
Muzinich was an architect of the Administration's tax reform effort, ultimately resulting in the Tax Cuts and Jobs Act of 2017.

CARES Act
Muzinich also helped draft and oversaw the U.S. government's $2.2 trillion rescue plan for the COVID-19 outbreak.

ProPublica reported in June 2020 that Muzinich transferred his ownership of at least $60 million in assets to his father who would be free to return them to Muzinich after he leaves government. The assets in question are shares in the company Muzinich & Co., which specializes in junk bonds. This firm was a beneficiary of a unprecedented decision by the Treasury and Federal Reserve to bail out the junk bond market as a response to the economic impact of the COVID-19 pandemic. Muzinich's actions had been disclosed to and approved by the Treasury Ethics Office and the Office of Government Ethics.

Personal life
Muzinich married Eloise Davis Austin in 2008. He is a member of the board of trustees of NewYork–Presbyterian Hospital.

References

External links

1977 births
Living people
Harvard University alumni
Harvard Business School alumni
Yale Law School alumni
United States Deputy Secretaries of the Treasury
Trump administration personnel
Columbia Business School faculty